Andries Bicker, lord of Engelenburg (Amsterdam, 1586 – 24 June 1652) was a powerful Amsterdam regent and Dutch politician during the Dutch Golden Age.

He was the leader of the Bickerse league and controlled the city's politics in close cooperation with his uncle Jacob Dircksz de Graeff and his brother Cornelis Bicker. The Bicker-De Graeff clan belonged to the Dutch States Party and were in opposition to the House of Orange.

Biography

Bicker family 

The Bicker family was one of the oldest patrician families of Amsterdam and belonged to the leading regent-oligarchy – consisting of Andries' father Gerrit Bicker, a wealthy patrician, politician, grain merchant and beer brewer, and his three brothers, Jacob, Jan and Cornelis Bicker had a firm grip on world trade, trading on the East, the West, the North and the Mediterranean. Andries' uncle Laurens Bicker was one of the first to trade on Guinea and seized four Portuguese ships in 1604.

Andries Bicker was married to Trijn Jansdr van Tengnagel (1595–1652). The couple had five children:
 Alida Bicker (1620-1702), lady of Engelenburg (she inherited the estate originally owned by her distant relative Pieter Dircksz Graeff through her cousin Jacob Bicker), married to another cousin of her named Jacob Bicker
 Gerard Bicker (1622-1666), unmarried; baljuw of Muiden
 Jan Bicker (1626-1657), unmarried 
 Cornelia Bicker (1629-1708), married to the Danish baron Joachim Irgens von Westervick
 Elisabeth Bicker (1631-1666), married to Salomon Sweers, younger brother of Admiral Isaac Sweers

One of Andries Bicker's granddaughters, Catharina Bicker (1642–1678) - daughter of Andries nephew Jacob Bicker (1612–1676) and his own daughter Alida Bicker - was married to a refugee, former Danish steward, councilor and chamberlain, imperial Count Palatine Jacob de Petersen.

Genealogical and political Legacy 

Andries and his brother Cornelis Bicker, together with their cousins Cornelis and Andries de Graeff, saw themselves as the political heirs of the old regent family Boelens, whose main lineage, which had remained catholic, had died out in the male line in 1647. They had received the very significant first names Andries and Cornelis from their Boelens ancestors. As in a real dynasty, members of the two families frequently intermarried in the 17th century in order to keep their political and commercial capital together. Its great historical ancestor was Andries Boelens (1455-1519), the city's most influential medieval mayor. Both families, Bicker and De Graeff, descend in the female line from Boelens. He was allowed to hold the highest office in Amsterdam fifteen times.

Regent of Amsterdam 
Andries Bicker was a wealthy Dutch merchant in Russia, a member of the Amsterdam vroedschap, the leader of the Arminians of Amsterdam, an administrator of the VOC, representative of the States-General of the Netherlands and colonel in the Civic guard.

Bicker became a member of the vroedschap in 1616, in 1620 schepen of Amsterdam and in 1627, just over forty, mayor of Amsterdam. He came to the fore through his knowledge and moderation. In 1627, he was delegated to go to Sweden and Poland, to close negotiations between these two countries, mediate a peace (culminating in the Treaty of Sztumska Wieś) and at the same time set up new Baltic trade agreements. In 1631 he was the owner of a few plots in Spanderswoud in 's-Graveland, the site where now the fine Trompenburgh house stands. The Bicker family also had concerns in peat-digging in Drenthe.

After Reynier Pauw's political end in the mid-1620s, the management of the city government fell into the hands of the Arminian clique around Andries Bicker and his uncle Jacob Dircksz de Graeff. This also gave new impetus to the republican state party, which had been weakened since the assassination of Johan van Oldenbarnevelt, and was able to determine Amsterdam politics for a long period of time.

In 1635 Bicker was one of the Dutch envoys at the Treaty of Stuhmsdorf. At the solemn entry of Maria de Medici into Amsterdam in 1638, he and Albert Burgh welcomed her in the name of the city's government. In 1643, he went with Jacob de Witt to Sweden to mediate between Sweden and Denmark. Seven members of the Bicker family, called the Bickerse league, opposed the stadtholder Frederick Henry, Prince of Orange, who intended the centralize the five admiralties, which would cause the Admiralty of Amsterdam to lose influence. The league included the brothers Andries, Jacob, Jan, Cornelis, Andries' son Gerard Bicker, and their distant cousins, the brothers Jacob Jacobsz Bicker (1612-1676; he was also the husband of Andries' daughter Alida Bicker) and Hendrick Jacobsz Bicker (1615-1651).

Conflict with William II of Orange 
In 1646 the seven members of the "Bickerse league", simultaneously held some political position or other. The Bickers provided silver and ships to Spain, and were very much interested in ending the Eighty Years War. This brought them again in conflict with the stadtholder, some provinces, like Zeeland and Utrecht, and the Reformed preachers.

Andries Bicker, along with his cousin Cornelis de Graeff, was the main initiator of Dutch participation in the Peace of Münster in 1648. After the Treaty was signed, Bicker was of the opinion that it was no longer necessary to maintain a standing army, bringing him into vehement conflict with the new stadholder Willem II of Orange, who had succeeded his father Frederick Henry as stadtholder. To regain power William went on the march towards Dordrecht and Amsterdam with an army. His troops got lost in a dense fog and were discovered by the postal courier on Hamburg, who also warned Andries' son Gerard, the high bailiff of Muiden, to leave without delay for Amsterdam. The mayors of Amsterdam had the civic guard called out, the bridges raised, the gates closed and the artillery dragged into Position. The attack failed but after the attack Cornelis de Graeff passed on a message from William II that Cornelis and Andries Bicker must resign from their posts on the vroedschap (town council). As result Andries Bicker was purged from the vroedschap, as was his brother Cornelis, as one of the conditions of the treaty that followed, led by De Graeff and Joan Huydecoper van Maarsseveen.

Outlook 
After the death of Andries Bicker and the other Bicker brothers, the family's influence ended. None of Andries descendants achieved a seat in the Amsterdam vroedschap.

Henceforth, it was the equally republican-minded brothers Cornelis and Andries de Graeff, and their following, who dominated Amsterdam and the States of Holland. His niece Wendela Bicker married the powerful raadspensionaris Johan de Witt, who dominated the Dutch politic of the later Golden Age until the Rampjaar 1672.

Notes and references

External links

 Andries Bicker Biography I at Nieuw Nederlandsch biografisch woordenboek
 Andries Bicker Biography II at Biographisch Woordenboek der Nederlanden
 Letterkundig woordenboek voor Noord en Zuid
Captain Bicker's Company by Joachim von Sandrart
Famous portrait of his son Gerard Bicker by Van der Helst
Pictures of Dutch voyage to Guinea, Argentina and Brazil

1586 births
1652 deaths
17th-century Dutch businesspeople
17th-century Dutch politicians
17th-century merchants
Arminian writers
Andries
Burials at the Oude Kerk, Amsterdam
Dutch merchants
Dutch States Party politicians
History of Amsterdam
Mayors of Amsterdam
Businesspeople from Amsterdam
Remonstrants